Schreiner is a family name of German origin.

Origin 
Schreiner  is an occupational surname and refers to a woodworker and often more specifically to a maker of fine woodwork; thus it translates to English as "joiner", "cabinetmaker", or (most broadly) "carpenter". Thus, for example, a German man of the Middle Ages named Johann Schreiner was literally "John the cabinetmaker", which differentiated him from other local men also named Johann, such as Johann Bäcker (John the baker) or Johann Weißkopf (White-haired John).

Some English spelling variations of the name are Shreiner, Schriner, and Shriner. (In the case of the Shriners organization, however, the name came from the English word shrine in the organization's full title, rather than through any founder surnamed Shriner.)

Notable people

Schreiner
 Alexander Schreiner, organist for the Mormon Tabernacle Choir
 Armin Schreiner, influential Croatian industrialist, banker and Jewish activist killed during the Holocaust
 Bernard Schreiner, French politician
 Dave Schreiner, American athlete
 David Schreiner, American politician
 Felix Schreiner (born 1986), German politician
 Josef Schreiner, German athlete
 Jumbo Schreiner (born 1967), German actor
 Knut Schreiner, aka Euroboy, Norwegian musician
 Kristian Schreiner, Norwegian physical anthropologist
 Mike Schreiner (born 1969), Canadian politician
 Olive Schreiner, South African author
 Oliver Schreiner, South Africa judge of the Appellate Division of the Supreme Court of South Africa
 Ottmar Schreiner, German politician
 William Philip Schreiner (1857-1919), South African politician

Schriner
Joe Schriner (born 1955), American political candidate
Sweeney Schriner (1911-1990), Canadian hockey player and Hall of Famer

Shriner
Earl Kenneth Shriner, American criminal
Herb Shriner (1918-1970), American entertainer
Kin Shriner (born 1953), American actor
Scott Shriner (born 1965), American musician
Wil Shriner (born 1953), American entertainer

Enterprises and institutions
 Schreiner's department store
 Schreiner Airways
 Schreiner University

German-language surnames
Occupational surnames